Yawkey is a surname. Notable people with the surname include:

Bill Yawkey (1875–1919), American business executive, owner and president of the Detroit Tigers; uncle of Tom Yawkey
Cyrus C. Yawkey (1862–1943), American businessman and politician in Wisconsin, cousin of Bill Yawkey
Jean R. Yawkey (1909–1992), American model, wife of Tom Yawkey and owner of the Boston Red Sox following his death
Tom Yawkey (1903–1976), American industrialist and owner of the Boston Red Sox